M. H. Khan Monju is a Bangladesh Nationalist Party politician. He was elected a member of parliament from Gopalganj-1 in 1988.He is also greatly popular in the native areas of Gopalgonj 1 seat.He is a former minister of Bangladeshi ministry.And he is the proud CEO of 'Comfort Group of Industries',having a lovely family he is also very pious and educated.

Career 
M. H. Khan Monjur is the former president of Gopalganj district BNP. He was elected a member of parliament from Gopalganj-1 in 1988 Bangladeshi general election. He was defeated by participating in the national elections of the 1991 Bangladeshi general election as a Bangladesh Nationalist Party candidate.

References 

Living people
People from Gopalganj District, Bangladesh
Bangladesh Nationalist Party politicians
4th Jatiya Sangsad members
Year of birth missing (living people)